The Arizona State University Research Park is a business and recreational park that is operated by Arizona State University. Located in the city of Tempe, Arizona, United States; the park sits on eastern half of the square mile bordered on the north by East Elliot Road, on the east by the Arizona State Highway: Route Loop 101 Price Freeway, on the south by East Warner Road, and the west by South McClintock Drive. Chuck Backus, formerly vice president and provost of ASU's East Campus, was elected as the President of the ASU Research Park in spring 2005.

Amazon has multiple offices in the Research Park including Amazon AZA1 (8375 S River Pkwy) and Amazon AZA10 (8600 S Science Dr).

ASU Research Park amenities
Access to the State Route 101 Price Freeway
Daycare facility on site
City Buses (Valley Metro)
Route 81 (North-South McClintock/Hayden)
Route 108 (East-West Elliot)
Route 511 (Chandler-Scottsdale Express via State Route 101)
FAA approved helipad
Access to services provided by ASU only for tenants
Three artificial lakes

List of Companies in the Research Park
 Aerials Express
American PEO, Inc.
 Anadigm
 ASE
ASML Holding
Avnet
Bridgestone-Firestone
 Bright Horizons
Camisa Technologies, Inc.
 Ceco Concrete
Center for Applied NanoBioscience
 CMC Interconnect Technologies
Countrywide Financial
Credence Systems
Edward Jones Investments
Etched In Time
 EV Group (EVG)
Fat Cat Animations
 Flexible Display Center at ASU
GaNotec Inc.
GE Healthcare
Great Wall Semiconductor
Honeywell
 Infocrossing
Iridium Satellite LLC
Institute for Supply Management
 Ito America
Laser Components DG Inc.
Linear Technology
North Central Association of Colleges and Schools
Nexus Energy Software
 PADT
Philips
 PowerOneData, Inc.
 Reproductive Medical Institute
 Systrends
Texas Instruments
 Thomas & Betts
 Titan Formwork Systems
Walgreens

External links
  Arizona State University Research Park official site
  Arizona State University official site

Arizona State University
Business parks of the United States
Parks in Arizona
Buildings and structures in Tempe, Arizona
Science parks in the United States